Ryan Michael LaMarre (born November 21, 1988) is an American professional baseball outfielder in the Minnesota Twins organization. He previously played in Major League Baseball (MLB) for the Cincinnati Reds, Boston Red Sox, Oakland Athletics, Chicago White Sox, and New York Yankees.

Amateur career
LaMarre attended Lumen Christi Catholic High School in Jackson, Michigan, where he earned 12 varsity letters in baseball, football, and hockey.

In baseball, LaMarre was named All-State three times, and hit .548 with 18 home runs as a senior. LaMarre set the school record for career home runs with 38.

In football, LaMarre won two state titles and made it to the state final during his senior season. He also was All-Conference in football, and compiled 339 tackles throughout his high school career.

In hockey, LaMarre won All-State honors twice and was team captain and MVP his final two seasons. He is the all-time assists leader for Lumen Christi, with 96, and is second in scoring, with 176.

After high school, LaMarre attended the University of Michigan. During his freshman year at Michigan, LaMarre batted .305 in 40 games. As a sophomore, he batted .344 with 12 home runs, playing and starting all 53 games. During his junior and final season, LaMarre batted .419 but only played in 36 games.

In 2009, he played collegiate summer baseball with the Wareham Gatemen of the Cape Cod Baseball League.

Professional career

Cincinnati Reds
The Cincinnati Reds selected LaMarre in the second round of the 2010 Major League Baseball draft. He was added to the Reds 40-man roster on November 20, 2013. The Reds designated LaMarre for assignment on August 12, 2014. The Reds released LaMarre, and then re-signed him to a minor league contract on August 19.

The Reds promoted LaMarre to the major leagues on August 20, 2015. He made his major league debut on August 22, and recorded his first major league hit the next day. LaMarre became a free agent after the 2015 season.

Overall for the Reds, LaMarre appeared in 21 MLB games, batting 2-for-25 (.080).

Boston Red Sox
LaMarre signed a minor league contract with the Boston Red Sox on December 14, 2015. On June 18, 2016, he was promoted from the Triple-A Pawtucket Red Sox to the major leagues. On July 2, LaMarre pitched in the top of the ninth inning in a 21–2 loss by the Red Sox to the Los Angeles Angels.  LaMarre gave up two hits but no runs, the only relief pitcher not to give up any runs in the game. He was designated for assignment on July 7, after the Red Sox traded for Aaron Hill.

Overall for the Red Sox, LaMarre appeared in 6 MLB games, batting 0-for-5.

Oakland Athletics
On November 28, 2016, LaMarre signed a one-year contract with the Los Angeles Angels, but did not make a major league appearance for them. The Angels traded him to the Oakland Athletics for a player to be named later on April 23, 2017. He was assigned to the Triple-A Nashville Sounds where he played one game before being recalled to Oakland after Rajai Davis was placed on the disabled list. LaMarre was designated for assignment on June 17, 2017, to create room for Michael Brady who had his contract purchased.

Overall for the Athletics, LaMarre appeared in 3 MLB games, batting 0-for-7.

Minnesota Twins
LaMarre signed a minor league contract with the Minnesota Twins on November 29, 2017. He made the Twins' 2018 Opening Day 25-man roster. On April 7, he got his first major league RBI. LaMarre made his second career pitching appearance on April 23, pitching  of an inning and giving up one earned run against the New York Yankees. He came to bat in the top of the following inning as the pitcher and struck out. LaMarre was designated for assignment on July 2, 2018.

Chicago White Sox
On July 9, 2018, LaMarre was claimed off waivers by the Chicago White Sox. He hit his first career home run on August 14, 2018, against the Detroit Tigers in Detroit.  On August 29, 2018, he knocked in all four runs with two doubles against CC Sabathia, and a home run, as the White Sox beat the Yankees 4–1.  He elected free agency on November 3, 2018.

Atlanta Braves
On November 19, 2018, LaMarre signed a minor league deal with the Atlanta Braves with an invitation to spring training. LaMarre spent most of 2019 with the Braves' AAA affiliate, the Gwinnett Stripers, where he played in 112 games while batting .311 with 9 HR and 53 RBI.

Minnesota Twins (second stint)
On September 8, 2019, LaMarre was traded to the Twins for cash considerations. LaMarre spent the last month of the season with the Twins and played in 14 MLB games batting .217 with 2 HR and 3 RBI. LaMarre was outrighted off the Twins roster on October 28, and elected free agency the next day.

Tampa Bay Rays
On January 13, 2020, LaMarre signed a minor league deal with the Tampa Bay Rays that included an invitation to spring training. LaMarre exercised his opt out clause on July 18, 2020, and became a free agent.

Chicago Cubs
On July 24, 2020, LaMarre signed a minor league contract with the Chicago Cubs. He was released by the organization on September 10, 2020.

New York Yankees
On December 12, 2020, LaMarre signed a minor league contract with the New York Yankees organization. On May 16, 2021, LaMarre was selected to the active roster, making his Yankees debut on the same day in a game against the Baltimore Orioles in center field, going 0-for-3. LaMarre went 0-for-7 in 3 games for the Yankees before being placed on the injured list with a right hamstring strain. On June 16, he activated off of the injured list and outrighted off of the 40-man roster.  On July 18, he was re-selected to the Yankees’ active roster after Tim Locastro was placed on the IL with an ACL injury. The same day, LaMarre hit another home run, a two-run shot off of Boston Red Sox pitcher Yacksel Ríos. On July 21, LaMarre earned his first walk-off win as he delivered a pinch hit single to right field to win the game in the 10th inning against the Philadelphia Phillies. On July 30, LaMarre was designated for assignment by the Yankees. On August 2, he was outrighted to the Triple-A Scranton/Wilkes-Barre Railriders. On October 7, LaMarre elected free agency. 

On March 16, 2022, LaMarre re-signed with the Yankees organization on a minor league contract. He elected free agency on November 10, 2022.

Minnesota Twins (third stint)
On January 11, 2023, LaMarre signed a minor league contract with the Minnesota Twins organization.

References

External links

1988 births
Living people
Sportspeople from Jackson, Michigan
Baseball players from Michigan
Major League Baseball outfielders
Cincinnati Reds players
Boston Red Sox players
Oakland Athletics players
Minnesota Twins players
Chicago White Sox players
New York Yankees players
Michigan Wolverines baseball players
Wareham Gatemen players
Dayton Dragons players
Lynchburg Hillcats players
Bakersfield Blaze players
Carolina Mudcats players
Pensacola Blue Wahoos players
Louisville Bats players
Glendale Desert Dogs players
Pawtucket Red Sox players
Salt Lake Bees players
Nashville Sounds players
Rochester Red Wings players
Charlotte Knights players
Gwinnett Stripers players
Scranton/Wilkes-Barre RailRiders players